Nationality words link to articles with information on the nation's poetry or literature (for instance, Irish or France).

Events 
 La bibliothèque canadienne, a French Canadian magazine edited by Michel Bibaud, begins publishing this year (and will continue to 1830)
 Dalry Burns Club established to honour the memory of Scottish poet Robert Burns; it claims the longest unbroken record of Burns suppers.

Poetry published

United Kingdom 
 Anna Laetitia Barbauld, The Works of Anna Laetitia Barbauld, edited by Lucy Aikin
 Sara Coleridge, translator from the French of Jacques de Mailles, The History of the Chevalier Bayard
 Louisa Costello, Songs of a Stranger
 Allan Cunningham, editor, The Songs of Scotland, Ancient and Modern, anthology
 Robert Davidson, Poems, Scotland
 Charles Dibdin the younger, Comic Tales and Lyrical Fancies
 Alexander Dyce, editor, Specimens of British Poetesses, anthology
 Felicia Dorothea Hemans, The Forest Sanctuary, and Other Poems
 Thomas Hood and J. H. Reynolds, published anonymously, Odes and Addresses to Great People
 Leigh Hunt, Bacchus in Tuscany, translated from the Italian, Bacco in Tuscana ("Bacchus in Tuscany") by Francesco Redi
 William Knox, Harp of Zion, Scotland
 Letitia Elizabeth Landon, writing under the pen name "L. E. L.", The Troubador, Catalogue of Pictures, and Historical Sketches
 Robert Southey, A Tale of Paraguay
 William Wordsworth, Yarrow Revisited, and Other Poems

United States 
 John Gardiner Calkins Brainard, Occasional Pieces of Poetry, a well-received collection partly reprinting poems the author had contributed to the Connecticut Mirror, which he edited from 1822 to 1827
 William Cullen Bryant:
 Lectures on Poetry, a series of four lectures given at the New York Athenaeum, presenting his theory of poetry, influenced by English Romantic poets; he also objected to the ideas that America lacked poetic material, that the country's language was too primitive for poetry and that American society was too pragmatic and materialistic to support a national poetry
 A Forest Hymn
 The Death of the Flowers
 Charles Follen, Hymns for Children
 Fitz-Greene Halleck, "Marco Bozzaris", inspired by the death of Bozarris, a Greek hero in the war of independence against the Ottoman Empire; the work appeared in several periodicals and was praised, although Edgar Allan Poe criticized it as lacking in lyricism
 William Leggett, Leisure Hours at Sea
 Henry Wadsworth Longfellow, poems published in several newspapers and the United States Literary Gazette include: "Autumnal Nightfall", "Woods in Winter", "The Angler's Song", and "Hymn of the Moravian Nuns"
 Edward Coote Pinkney, Poems, lyric verses including "Rudolph, a Fragment" (first published separately 1823)), in the style of Lord Byron
 William Gilmore Simms, Monody on Gen. Charles Cotesworth Pinckney, Charleston

Other
 Marceline Desbordes-Valmore, Elégies et Poésies nouvelles, France
 Adam Mickiewicz, Crimean Sonnets, Poland
 Kondraty Ryleyev, Rogneda, Russia, approximate date

Births 
Death years link to the corresponding "[year] in poetry" article:
 January 11 – Bayard Taylor (died 1878), American poet and travel writer
 May 4 – Thomas Henry Huxley (died 1895), English evolutionist and occasional poet (Nettie, born Henrietta Heathorn (died 1914), his wife, is also born this year)
 June 6 – Peter John Allan (died 1848), Canadian poet
 July 20 or 25 – John Askham (died 1894), English shoemaker and poet
 September 24 – Frances Harper, born Frances Ellen Watkins (died 1911), black American poet and abolitionist
 October 30 – Adelaide Anne Procter (died 1864), English poet and philanthropist
 Dhiro (born 1753), Gujarati devotional poet

Deaths 
Birth years link to the corresponding "[year] in poetry" article:
 March 9 – Anna Laetitia Barbauld (born 1743), English poet
 May 6 – Lady Anne Barnard (born 1750), Scottish-born ballad and travel writer
 August 12 – Magdalene Sophie Buchholm (born 1758), Norwegian poet
 August 27 – Lucretia Maria Davidson (born 1808), American poet, of consumption
 November 12 – William Knox (born 1789), Scottish poet, of a stroke
 December 5 – Mary Whateley (born 1738), English poet and hymnodist

See also

 Poetry
 List of years in poetry
 List of years in literature
 19th century in literature
 19th century in poetry
 Romantic poetry
 Golden Age of Russian Poetry (1800–1850)
 Weimar Classicism period in Germany, commonly considered to have begun in 1788  and to have ended either in 1805, with the death of Friedrich Schiller, or 1832, with the death of Goethe
 List of poets

Notes

19th-century poetry
Poetry